Medieval music encompasses the sacred and secular music of Western Europe during the Middle Ages, from approximately the 6th to 15th centuries. It is the first and longest major era of Western classical music and followed by the Renaissance music; the two eras comprise what musicologists generally term as early music, preceding the common practice period. Following the traditional division of the Middle Ages, medieval music can be divided into Early (500–1150), High (1000–1300), and Late (1300–1400) medieval music.

Medieval music includes liturgical music used for the church, and secular music, non-religious music; solely vocal music, such as Gregorian chant and choral music (music for a group of singers), solely instrumental music, and music that uses both voices and instruments (typically with the instruments accompanying the voices). Gregorian chant was sung by monks during Catholic Mass. The Mass is a reenactment of Christ's Last Supper, intended to provide a spiritual connection between man and God. Part of this connection was established through music.

During the medieval period the foundation was laid for the music notation and music theory practices that would shape Western music into the norms that developed during the Common Practice period of shared music writing practices which encompassed the Baroque era (1600–1750), Classical era (1750–1820) and Romantic era (1800–1910). The most significant of these is the development of a comprehensive music notational system which enabled composers to write out their song melodies and instrumental pieces on parchment or paper. Prior to the development of musical notation, songs and pieces had to be learned "by ear", from one person who knew a song to another person. This greatly limited how many people could be taught new music and how wide music could spread to other regions or countries. The development of music notation made it easier to disseminate (spread) songs and musical pieces to a larger number of people and to a wider geographic area. However the theoretical advances, particularly in regard to rhythm—the timing of notes—and polyphony—using multiple, interweaving melodies at the same time—are equally important to the development of Western music.

Overview

Genres

Medieval music was composed and, for some vocal and instrumental music, improvised for many different music genres (styles of music). Medieval music created for sacred (church use) and secular (non-religious use) was typically written by composers, except for some sacred vocal and secular instrumental music which was improvised (made up on the spot). During the earlier medieval period, the liturgical genre, predominantly Gregorian chant done by monks, was monophonic ("monophonic" means a single melodic line, without a harmony part or instrumental accompaniment). Polyphonic genres, in which multiple independent melodic lines are performed simultaneously, began to develop during the high medieval era, becoming prevalent by the later 13th and early 14th century. The development of polyphonic forms, with different voices interweaving, is often associated with the late medieval Ars nova style which flourished in the 1300s. The Ars Nova, which means "new art", was an innovative style of writing music that served as a key transition from the medieval music style to the more expressive styles of the post-1400s Renaissance music era.

The earliest innovations upon monophonic plainchant were heterophonic. "Heterophony" is the performance of the same melody by two different performers at the same time, in which each performer slightly alters the ornaments they are using. Another simple form of heterophony is for singers to sing the same shape of melody, but with one person singing the melody and a second person singing the melody at a higher or lower pitch. Organum, for example, expanded upon plainchant melody using an accompanying line, sung at a fixed interval (often a perfect fifth or perfect fourth away from the main melody), with a resulting alternation between a simple form of polyphony and monophony. The principles of organum date back to an anonymous 9th century tract, the Musica enchiriadis, which established the tradition of duplicating a preexisting plainchant in parallel motion at the interval of an octave, a fifth or a fourth.

Of greater sophistication was the motet, which developed from the clausula genre of medieval plainchant. The motet would become the most popular form of medieval polyphony. While early motets were liturgical or sacred (designed for use in a church service), by the end of the thirteenth century the genre had expanded to include secular topics, such as courtly love. Courtly love was the respectful veneration of a lady from afar by an amorous, noble man. Many popular motets had lyrics about a man's love and adoration of beautiful, noble and much-admired women.

The medieval motet developed during the Renaissance music era (after 1400). During the Renaissance, the Italian secular genre of the Madrigal became popular. Similar to the polyphonic character of the motet, madrigals featured greater fluidity and motion in the leading melody line. The madrigal form also gave rise to polyphonic canons (songs in which multiple singers sing the same melody, but starting at different times), especially in Italy where they were called caccie. These were three-part secular pieces, which featured the two higher voices in canon, with an underlying instrumental long-note accompaniment.

Finally, purely instrumental music also developed during this period, both in the context of a growing theatrical tradition and for court performances for the aristocracy. Dance music, often improvised around familiar tropes, was the largest purely instrumental genre. The secular Ballata, which became very popular in Trecento Italy, had its origins, for instance, in medieval instrumental dance music.

Instruments

Many instruments used to perform medieval music still exist in the 21st century, but in different and typically more technologically developed forms. The flute was made of wood in the medieval era rather than silver or other metal, and could be made as a side-blown or end-blown instrument. While modern orchestral flutes are usually made of metal and have complex key mechanisms and airtight pads, medieval flutes had holes that the performer had to cover with the fingers (as with the recorder). The recorder was made of wood during the medieval era, and despite the fact that in the 21st century it may be made of synthetic materials such as plastic, it has more or less retained its past form. The gemshorn is similar to the recorder as it has finger holes on its front, though it is actually a member of the ocarina family. One of the flute's predecessors, the pan flute, was popular in medieval times, and is possibly of Hellenic origin. This instrument's pipes were made of wood, and were graduated in length to produce different pitches.

Medieval music used many plucked string instruments like the lute, a fretted instrument with a pear-shaped hollow body which is the predecessor to the modern guitar. Other plucked stringed instruments included the mandore, gittern, citole and psaltery. The dulcimers, similar in structure to the psaltery and zither, were originally plucked, but musicians began to strike the dulcimer with hammers in the 14th century after the arrival of new metal technology that made metal strings possible.

The bowed lyra of the Byzantine Empire was the first recorded European bowed string instrument. Like the modern violin, a performer produced sound by moving a bow with tensioned hair over tensioned strings. The Persian geographer Ibn Khurradadhbih of the 9th century (d. 911) cited the Byzantine lyra, in his lexicographical discussion of instruments as a bowed instrument equivalent to the Arab rabāb and typical instrument of the Byzantines along with the urghun (organ), shilyani (probably a type of harp or lyre) and the salandj (probably a bagpipe). The hurdy-gurdy was (and still is) a mechanical violin using a rosined wooden wheel attached to a crank to "bow" its strings. Instruments without sound boxes like the jew's harp were also popular. Early versions of the pipe organ, fiddle (or vielle), and a precursor to the modern trombone (called the sackbut) were used.

Notation
During the medieval period the foundation was laid for the notational and theoretical practices that would shape Western music into the norms that developed during the common practice era. The most obvious of these is the development of a comprehensive music notational system; however the theoretical advances, particularly in regard to rhythm and polyphony, are equally important to the development of Western music.

The earliest medieval music did not have any kind of notational system. The tunes were primarily monophonic (a single melody without accompaniment) and transmitted by oral tradition.  As Rome tried to centralize the various liturgies and establish the Roman rite as the primary church tradition the need to transmit these chant melodies across vast distances effectively was equally glaring. So long as music could only be taught to people "by ear," it limited the ability of the church to get different regions to sing the same melodies, since each new person would have to spend time with a person who already knew a song and learn it "by ear." The first step to fix this problem came with the introduction of various signs written above the chant texts to indicate direction of pitch movement, called neumes.

The origin of neumes is unclear and subject to some debate; however, most scholars agree that their closest ancestors are the classic Greek and Roman grammatical signs that indicated important points of declamation by recording the rise and fall of the voice. The two basic signs of the classical grammarians were the acutus, /, indicating a raising of the voice, and the gravis, \, indicating a lowering of the voice. A singer reading a chant text with neume markings would be able to get a general sense of whether the melody line went up in pitch, stayed the same, or went down in pitch. Since trained singers knew the chant repertoire well, written neume markings above the text served as a reminder of the melody but did not specify the actual intervals. However, a singer reading a chant text with neume markings would not be able to sight read a song which he or she had never heard sung before; these pieces would not be possible to interpret accurately today without later versions in more precise notation systems.

These neumes eventually evolved into the basic symbols for neumatic notation, the virga (or "rod") which indicates a higher note and still looked like the acutus from which it came; and the punctum (or "dot") which indicates a lower note and, as the name suggests, reduced the gravis symbol to a point. Thus the acutus and the gravis could be combined to represent graphical vocal inflections on the syllable. This kind of notation seems to have developed no earlier than the eighth century, but by the ninth it was firmly established as the primary method of musical notation. The basic notation of the virga and the punctum remained the symbols for individual notes, but other neumes soon developed which showed several notes joined. These new neumes—called ligatures—are essentially combinations of the two original signs.

The first music notation was the use of dots over the lyrics to a chant, with some dots being higher or lower, giving the reader a general sense of the direction of the melody. However, this form of notation only served as a memory aid for a singer who already knew the melody. This basic neumatic notation could only specify the number of notes and whether they moved up or down. There was no way to indicate exact pitch, any rhythm, or even the starting note. These limitations are further indication that the neumes were developed as tools to support the practice of oral tradition, rather than to supplant it. However, even though it started as a mere memory aid, the worth of having more specific notation soon became evident.

The next development in musical notation was "heighted neumes", in which neumes were carefully placed at different heights in relation to each other. This allowed the neumes to give a rough indication of the size of a given interval as well as the direction. This quickly led to one or two lines, each representing a particular note, being placed on the music with all of the neumes relating to the earlier ones. At first, these lines had no particular meaning and instead had a letter placed at the beginning indicating which note was represented. However, the lines indicating middle C and the F a fifth below slowly became most common. Having been at first merely scratched on the parchment, the lines now were drawn in two different colored inks: usually red for F, and yellow or green for C. This was the beginning of the musical staff. The completion of the four-line staff is usually credited to Guido d' Arezzo (c. 1000–1050), one of the most important musical theorists of the Middle Ages. While older sources attribute the development of the staff to Guido, some modern scholars suggest that he acted more as a codifier of a system that was already being developed. Either way, this new notation allowed a singer to learn pieces completely unknown to him in a much shorter amount of time. However, even though chant notation had progressed in many ways, one fundamental problem remained: rhythm. The neumatic notational system, even in its fully developed state, did not clearly define any kind of rhythm for the singing of notes.

Music theory

The music theory of the medieval period saw several advances over previous practice both in regard to tonal material, texture, and rhythm.

Rhythm

Concerning rhythm, this period had several dramatic changes in both its conception and notation. During the early medieval period there was no method to notate rhythm, and thus the rhythmical practice of this early music is subject to debate among scholars. The first kind of written rhythmic system developed during the 13th century and was based on a series of modes. This rhythmic plan was codified by the music theorist Johannes de Garlandia, author of the De Mensurabili Musica (c.1250), the treatise which defined and most completely elucidated these rhythmic modes. In his treatise Johannes de Garlandia describes six species of mode, or six different ways in which longs and breves can be arranged. Each mode establishes a rhythmic pattern in beats (or tempora) within a common unit of three tempora (a perfectio) that is repeated again and again. Furthermore, notation without text is based on chains of ligatures (the characteristic notations by which groups of notes are bound to one another).

The rhythmic mode can generally be determined by the patterns of ligatures used. Once a rhythmic mode had been assigned to a melodic line, there was generally little deviation from that mode, although rhythmic adjustments could be indicated by changes in the expected pattern of ligatures, even to the extent of changing to another rhythmic mode. The next step forward concerning rhythm came from the German theorist Franco of Cologne. In his treatise Ars cantus mensurabilis ("The Art of Mensurable Music"), written around 1280, he describes a system of notation in which differently shaped notes have entirely different rhythmic values. This is a striking change from the earlier system of de Garlandia. Whereas before the length of the individual note could only be gathered from the mode itself, this new inverted relationship made the mode dependent upon—and determined by—the individual notes or figurae that have incontrovertible durational values, an innovation which had a massive impact on the subsequent history of European music. Most of the surviving notated music of the 13th century uses the rhythmic modes as defined by Garlandia. The step in the evolution of rhythm came after the turn of the 13th century with the development of the Ars Nova style.

The theorist who is most well recognized in regard to this new style is Philippe de Vitry, famous for writing the Ars Nova ("New Art") treatise around 1320. This treatise on music gave its name to the style of this entire era. In some ways the modern system of rhythmic notation began with Vitry, who completely broke free from the older idea of the rhythmic modes. The notational predecessors of modern time meters also originate in the Ars Nova. This new style was clearly built upon the work of Franco of Cologne. In Franco's system, the relationship between a breve and a semibreves (that is, half breves) was equivalent to that between a breve and a long: and, since for him modus was always perfect (grouped in threes), the tempus or beat was also inherently perfect and therefore contained three semibreves. Sometimes the context of the mode would require a group of only two semibreves, however, these two semibreves would always be one of normal length and one of double length, thereby taking the same space of time, and thus preserving the perfect subdivision of the tempus. This ternary division held for all note values. In contrast, the Ars Nova period introduced two important changes: the first was an even smaller subdivision of notes (semibreves, could now be divided into minim), and the second was the development of "mensuration."

Mensurations could be combined in various manners to produce metrical groupings. These groupings of mensurations are the precursors of simple and compound meter. By the time of Ars Nova, the perfect division of the tempus was not the only option as duple divisions became more accepted. For Vitry the breve could be divided, for an entire composition, or section of one, into groups of two or three smaller semibreves. This way, the tempus (the term that came to denote the division of the breve) could be either "perfect" (tempus perfectum), with ternary subdivision, or "imperfect" (tempus imperfectum), with binary subdivision. In a similar fashion, the semibreve's division (termed prolation) could be divided into three minima (prolatio perfectus or major prolation) or two minima (prolatio imperfectus or minor prolation) and, at the higher level, the longs division (called modus) could be three or two breves (modus perfectus or perfect mode, or modus imperfectus or imperfect mode respectively). Vitry took this a step further by indicating the proper division of a given piece at the beginning through the use of a "mensuration sign", equivalent to our modern "time signature".

Tempus perfectum was indicated by a circle, while tempus imperfectum was denoted by a half-circle (the current symbol , used as an alternative for the  time signature, is actually a holdover of this symbol, not a letter C as an abbreviation for "common time", as popularly believed). While many of these innovations are ascribed to Vitry, and somewhat present in the Ars Nova treatise, it was a contemporary—and personal acquaintance—of de Vitry, named Johannes de Muris (or Jehan des Mars) who offered the most comprehensive and systematic treatment of the new mensural innovations of the Ars Nova (for a brief explanation of the mensural notation in general, see the article Renaissance music). Many scholars, citing a lack of positive attributory evidence, now consider "Vitry's" treatise to be anonymous, but this does not diminish its importance for the history of rhythmic notation. However, this makes the first definitely identifiable scholar to accept and explain the mensural system to be de Muris, who can be said to have done for it what Garlandia did for the rhythmic modes.

For the duration of the medieval period, most music would be composed primarily in perfect tempus, with special effects created by sections of imperfect tempus; there is a great current controversy among musicologists as to whether such sections were performed with a breve of equal length or whether it changed, and if so, at what proportion. This Ars Nova style remained the primary rhythmical system until the highly syncopated works of the Ars subtilior at the end of the 14th century, characterized by extremes of notational and rhythmic complexity. This sub-genera pushed the rhythmic freedom provided by Ars Nova to its limits, with some compositions having different voices written in different mensurations simultaneously. The rhythmic complexity that was realized in this music is comparable to that in the 20th century.

Polyphony

Of equal importance to the overall history of western music theory were the textural changes that came with the advent of polyphony. This practice shaped western music into the harmonically dominated music that we know today. The first accounts of this textural development were found in two anonymous yet widely circulated treatises on music, the Musica and the Scolica enchiriadis. These texts are dated to sometime within the last half of the ninth century. The treatises describe a technique that seemed already to be well established in practice. This early polyphony is based on three simple and three compound intervals. The first group comprises fourths, fifths, and octaves; while the second group has octave-plus-fourths, octave-plus-fifths, and double octaves. This new practice is given the name organum by the author of the treatises. Organum can further be classified depending on the time period in which it was written. The early organum as described in the enchiriadis can be termed "strict organum"  Strict organum can, in turn, be subdivided into two types: diapente (organum at the interval of a fifth) and diatesseron (organum at the interval of a fourth). However, both of these kinds of strict organum had problems with the musical rules of the time. If either of them paralleled an original chant for too long (depending on the mode) a tritone would result.

This problem was somewhat overcome with the use of a second type of organum. This second style of organum was called "free organum". Its distinguishing factor is that the parts did not have to move only in parallel motion, but could also move in oblique, or contrary motion. This made it much easier to avoid the dreaded tritone. The final style of organum that developed was known as "melismatic organum", which was a rather dramatic departure from the rest of the polyphonic music up to this point. This new style was not note against note, but was rather one sustained line accompanied by a florid melismatic line. This final kind of organum was also incorporated by the most famous polyphonic composer of this time—Léonin. He united this style with measured discant passages, which used the rhythmic modes to create the pinnacle of organum composition. This final stage of organum is sometimes referred to as Notre Dame school of polyphony, since that was where Léonin (and his student Pérotin) were stationed. Furthermore, this kind of polyphony influenced all subsequent styles, with the later polyphonic genera of motets starting as a trope of existing Notre Dame organums.

Another important element of medieval music theory was the system by which pitches were arranged and understood. During the Middle Ages, this systematic arrangement of a series of whole steps and half steps, what we now call a scale, was known as a mode. The modal system worked like the scales of today, insomuch that it provided the rules and material for melodic writing. The eight church modes are: Dorian, Hypodorian, Phrygian, Hypophrygian, Lydian, Hypolydian, Mixolydian, and Hypomixolydian. Much of the information concerning these modes, as well as the practical application of them, was codified in the 11th century by the theorist Johannes Afflighemensis. In his work he describes three defining elements to each mode: the final (or finalis), the reciting tone (tenor or confinalis), and the range (or ambitus). The finalis is the tone that serves as the focal point for the mode and, as the name suggests, is almost always used as the final tone. The reciting tone is the tone that serves as the primary focal point in the melody (particularly internally). It is generally also the tone most often repeated in the piece, and finally the range delimits the upper and lower tones for a given mode. The eight modes can be further divided into four categories based on their final (finalis).

Medieval theorists called these pairs maneriae and labeled them according to the Greek ordinal numbers. Those modes that have d, e, f, and g as their final are put into the groups protus, deuterus, tritus, and tetrardus respectively. These can then be divided further based on whether the mode is "authentic" or "plagal." These distinctions deal with the range of the mode in relation to the final. The authentic modes have a range that is about an octave (one tone above or below is allowed) and start on the final, whereas the plagal modes, while still covering about an octave, start a perfect fourth below the authentic. Another interesting aspect of the modal system is the universal allowance for altering B to B no matter what the mode. The inclusion of this tone has several uses, but one that seems particularly common is in order to avoid melodic difficulties caused, once again, by the tritone.

These ecclesiastical modes, although they have Greek names, have little relationship to the modes as set out by Greek theorists. Rather, most of the terminology seems to be a misappropriation on the part of the medieval theorists Although the church modes have no relation to the ancient Greek modes, the overabundance of Greek terminology does point to an interesting possible origin in the liturgical melodies of the Byzantine tradition. This system is called octoechos and is also divided into eight categories, called echoi. 
 
For specific medieval music theorists, see also: Isidore of Seville, Aurelian of Réôme, Odo of Cluny, Guido of Arezzo, Hermannus Contractus, Johannes Cotto (Johannes Afflighemensis), Johannes de Muris, Franco of Cologne, Johannes de Garlandia (Johannes Gallicus), Anonymous IV, Marchetto da Padova (Marchettus of Padua), Jacques of Liège, Johannes de Grocheo, Petrus de Cruce (Pierre de la Croix), and Philippe de Vitry.

Early medieval music (500–1000)

Early chant traditions

Chant (or plainsong) is a monophonic sacred (single, unaccompanied melody) form which represents the earliest known music of the Christian church. Chant developed separately in several European centres. Although the most important were Rome, Hispania, Gaul, Milan, and Ireland, there were others as well. These styles were all developed to support the regional liturgies used when celebrating the Mass there. Each area developed its own chant and rules for celebration. In Spain and Portugal, Mozarabic chant was used and shows the influence of North African music. The Mozarabic liturgy even survived through Muslim rule, though this was an isolated strand and this music was later suppressed in an attempt to enforce conformity on the entire liturgy. In Milan, Ambrosian chant, named after St. Ambrose, was the standard, while Beneventan chant developed around Benevento, another Italian liturgical center. Gallican chant was used in Gaul, and Celtic chant in Ireland and Great Britain.

The reigning Carolingian dynasty wanted to standardize the Mass and chant across its Frankish Empire. At this time, Rome was the religious centre of western Europe, and northern Gaul and Rhineland (most notably the city of Aachen) was the political centre. The standardization effort consisted mainly of combining the two – Roman and Gallican – regional liturgies. Charlemagne (742–814) sent trained singers throughout the Empire to teach this new form of chant. This body of chant became known as Gregorian Chant, named after Pope Gregory I. Gregorian chant was said to be collected and codified during his papacy or even composed by himself, inspired by the Holy Spirit in the form of a dove. However, that is only a popular legend that was spread by the Carolingians who wanted to legitimize their liturgy unification efforts. Gregorian chant certainly didn't exist at that time. It is possible, nevertheless, that Gregory's papacy really may have contributed to collecting and codifying the Roman chant of the time which then, in the 9th and 10th centuries, formed  – alongside the Gallican chant – one of the two roots of the Gregorian chant. By the 12th and 13th centuries, Gregorian chant had superseded all the other Western chant traditions, with the exception of the Ambrosian chant in Milan and the Mozarabic chant in a few specially designated Spanish chapels. Hildegard von Bingen (1098–1179) was one of the earliest known female composers. She wrote many monophonic works for the Catholic Church, almost all of them for female voices.

Early polyphony: organum

Around the end of the 9th century, singers in monasteries such as St. Gall in Switzerland began experimenting with adding another part to the chant, generally a voice in parallel motion, singing mostly in perfect fourths or fifths above the original tune (see interval). This development is called organum and represents the beginnings of counterpoint and, ultimately, harmony. Over the next several centuries, organum developed in several ways.

The most significant of these developments was the creation of "florid organum" around 1100, sometimes known as the school of St. Martial (named after a monastery in south-central France, which contains the best-preserved manuscript of this repertory). In "florid organum" the original tune would be sung in long notes while an accompanying voice would sing many notes to each one of the original, often in a highly elaborate fashion, all the while emphasizing the perfect consonances (fourths, fifths and octaves), as in the earlier organa. Later developments of organum occurred in England, where the interval of the third was particularly favoured, and where organa were likely improvised against an existing chant melody, and at Notre Dame in Paris, which was to be the centre of musical creative activity throughout the thirteenth century.

Much of the music from the early medieval period is anonymous. Some of the names may have been poets and lyric writers, and the tunes for which they wrote words may have been composed by others. Attribution of monophonic music of the medieval period is not always reliable. Surviving manuscripts from this period include the Musica Enchiriadis, Codex Calixtinus of Santiago de Compostela, the Magnus Liber, and the Winchester Troper. For information about specific composers or poets writing during the early medieval period, see Pope Gregory I, St. Godric, Hildegard of Bingen, Hucbald, Notker Balbulus, Odo of Arezzo, Odo of Cluny, and Tutilo.

Liturgical drama

Another musical tradition of Europe originating during the early Middle Ages was the liturgical drama.

Liturgical drama developed possibly in the 10th century from the tropes—poetic embellishments of the liturgical texts. One of the tropes, the so-called Quem Quaeritis, belonging to the liturgy of Easter morning, developed into a short play around the year 950. The oldest surviving written source is the Winchester Troper. Around the year 1000 it was sung widely in Northern Europe.

Shortly, a similar Christmas play was developed, musically and textually following the Easter one, and other plays followed.

There is a controversy among musicologists as to the instrumental accompaniment of such plays, given that the stage directions, very elaborate and precise in other respects, do not request any participation of instruments. These dramas were performed by monks, nuns and priests. In contrast to secular plays, which were spoken, the liturgical drama was always sung. Many have been preserved sufficiently to allow modern reconstruction and performance (for example the Play of Daniel, which has been recently recorded at least ten times).

High medieval music (1000–1300)

Goliards

The Goliards were itinerant poet-musicians of Europe from the tenth to the middle of the thirteenth century. Most were scholars or ecclesiastics, and they wrote and sang in Latin. Although many of the poems have survived, very little of the music has. They were possibly influential—even decisively so—on the troubadour-trouvère tradition which was to follow. Most of their poetry is secular and, while some of the songs celebrate religious ideals, others are frankly profane, dealing with drunkenness, debauchery and lechery. One of the most important extant sources of Goliards chansons is the Carmina Burana.

Ars antiqua

The flowering of the Notre Dame school of polyphony from around 1150 to 1250 corresponded to the equally impressive achievements in Gothic architecture: indeed the centre of activity was at the cathedral of Notre Dame itself. Sometimes the music of this period is called the Parisian school, or Parisian organum, and represents the beginning of what is conventionally known as Ars antiqua. This was the period in which rhythmic notation first appeared in western music, mainly a context-based method of rhythmic notation known as the rhythmic modes.

This was also the period in which concepts of formal structure developed which were attentive to proportion, texture, and architectural effect. Composers of the period alternated florid and discant organum (more note-against-note, as opposed to the succession of many-note melismas against long-held notes found in the florid type), and created several new musical forms: clausulae, which were melismatic sections of organa extracted and fitted with new words and further musical elaboration; conductus, which were songs for one or more voices to be sung rhythmically, most likely in a procession of some sort; and tropes, which were additions of new words and sometimes new music to sections of older chant. All of these genres save one were based upon chant; that is, one of the voices, (usually three, though sometimes four) nearly always the lowest (the tenor at this point) sang a chant melody, though with freely composed note-lengths, over which the other voices sang organum. The exception to this method was the conductus, a two-voice composition that was freely composed in its entirety.

The motet, one of the most important musical forms of the high Middle Ages and Renaissance, developed initially during the Notre Dame period out of the clausula, especially the form using multiple voices as elaborated by Pérotin, who paved the way for this particularly by replacing many of his predecessor (as canon of the cathedral) Léonin's lengthy florid clausulae with substitutes in a discant style. Gradually, there came to be entire books of these substitutes, available to be fitted in and out of the various chants. Since, in fact, there were more than can possibly have been used in context, it is probable that the clausulae came to be performed independently, either in other parts of the mass, or in private devotions. The clausula, thus practised, became the motet when troped with non-liturgical words, and this further developed into a form of great elaboration, sophistication and subtlety in the fourteenth century, the period of Ars nova. Surviving manuscripts from this era include the Montpellier Codex, Bamberg Codex, and Las Huelgas Codex.

Composers of this time include Léonin, Pérotin, W. de Wycombe, Adam de St. Victor, and Petrus de Cruce (Pierre de la Croix). Petrus is credited with the innovation of writing more than three semibreves to fit the length of a breve. Coming before the innovation of imperfect tempus, this practice inaugurated the era of what are now called "Petronian" motets. These late 13th-century works are in three to four parts and have multiple texts sung simultaneously. Originally, the tenor line (from the Latin tenere, "to hold") held a preexisting liturgical chant line in the original Latin, while the text of the one, two, or even three voices above, called the voces organales, provided commentary on the liturgical subject either in Latin or in the vernacular French. The rhythmic values of the voces organales decreased as the parts multiplied, with the duplum (the part above the tenor) having smaller rhythmic values than the tenor, the triplum (the line above the duplum) having smaller rhythmic values than the duplum, and so on. As time went by, the texts of the voces organales became increasingly secular in nature and had less and less overt connection to the liturgical text in the tenor line.

The increasing rhythmic complexity seen in Petronian motets would be a fundamental characteristic of the 14th century, though music in France, Italy, and England would take quite different paths during that time.

Cantigas de Santa Maria

The Cantigas de Santa Maria ("Canticles of St. Mary") are 420 poems with musical notation, written in Galician-Portuguese during the reign of Alfonso X The Wise (1221–1284). The manuscript was probably compiled from 1270 to 1280, and is highly decorated, with an illumination every 10 poems. The illuminations often depict musicians making the manuscript a particularly important source of medieval music iconography. Though the Cantigas are often attributed to Alfonso, it remains unclear as to whether he was a composer himself, or perhaps a compiler; Alfonso is known to regularly invited musicians and poets to court whom were undoubtedly involved in the Cantigas production.

It is one of the largest collections of monophonic (solo) songs from the Middle Ages and is characterized by the mention of the Virgin Mary in every song, while every tenth song is a hymn. The manuscripts have survived in four codices: two at El Escorial, one at Madrid's National Library, and one in Florence, Italy. Some have colored miniatures showing pairs of musicians playing a wide variety of instruments.

Troubadours, trouvères and Minnesänger

The music of the troubadours and trouvères was a vernacular tradition of monophonic secular song, probably accompanied by instruments, sung by professional, occasionally itinerant, musicians who were as skilled as poets as they were singers and instrumentalists. The language of the troubadours was Occitan (also known as the langue d'oc, or Provençal); the language of the trouvères was Old French (also known as langue d'oil). The period of the troubadours corresponded to the flowering of cultural life in Provence which lasted through the twelfth century and into the first decade of the thirteenth. Typical subjects of troubadour song were war, chivalry and courtly love—the love of an idealized woman from afar. The period of the troubadours wound down after the Albigensian Crusade, the fierce campaign by Pope Innocent III to eliminate the Cathar heresy (and northern barons' desire to appropriate the wealth of the south). Surviving troubadours went either to Portugal, Spain, northern Italy or northern France (where the trouvère tradition lived on), where their skills and techniques contributed to the later developments of secular musical culture in those places.

The trouvères and troubadours shared similar musical styes, but the trouvères were generally noblemen. The music of the trouvères was similar to that of the troubadours, but was able to survive into the thirteenth century unaffected by the Albigensian Crusade. Most of the more than two thousand surviving trouvère songs include music, and show a sophistication as great as that of the poetry it accompanies.

The Minnesänger tradition was the Germanic counterpart to the activity of the troubadours and trouvères to the west. Unfortunately, few sources survive from the time; the sources of Minnesang are mostly from two or three centuries after the peak of the movement, leading to some controversy over the accuracy of these sources. Among the Minnesängers with surviving music are Wolfram von Eschenbach, Walther von der Vogelweide, and Niedhart von Reuenthal.

Trovadorismo

In the Middle Ages, Galician-Portuguese was the language used in nearly all of Iberia for lyric poetry. From this language derive both modern Galician and Portuguese. The Galician-Portuguese school, which was influenced to some extent (mainly in certain formal aspects) by the Occitan troubadours, is first documented at the end of the twelfth century and lasted until the middle of the fourteenth.

The earliest extant composition in this school is usually agreed to be Ora faz ost' o senhor de Navarra by the Portuguese João Soares de Paiva, usually dated just before or after 1200. The troubadours of the movement, not to be confused with the Occitan troubadours (who frequented courts in nearby León and Castile), wrote almost entirely cantigas. Beginning probably around the middle of the thirteenth century, these songs, known also as cantares or trovas, began to be compiled in collections known as cancioneiros (songbooks). Three such anthologies are known: the Cancioneiro da Ajuda, the Cancioneiro Colocci-Brancuti (or Cancioneiro da Biblioteca Nacional de Lisboa), and the Cancioneiro da Vaticana. In addition to these there is the priceless collection of over 400 Galician-Portuguese cantigas in the Cantigas de Santa Maria, which tradition attributes to Alfonso X.

The Galician-Portuguese cantigas can be divided into three basic genres: male-voiced love poetry, called cantigas de amor (or cantigas d'amor, in Galician-Portuguese spelling) female-voiced love poetry, called cantigas de amigo (or cantigas d'amigo); and poetry of insult and mockery called cantigas de escárnio e maldizer (or cantigas d'escarnho e de mal dizer). All three are lyric genres in the technical sense that they were strophic songs with either musical accompaniment or introduction on a stringed instrument. But all three genres also have dramatic elements, leading early scholars to characterize them as lyric-dramatic.

The origins of the cantigas d'amor are usually traced to Provençal and Old French lyric poetry, but formally and rhetorically they are quite different. The cantigas d'amigo are probably rooted in a native song tradition, though this view has been contested. The cantigas d'escarnho e maldizer may also (according to Lang) have deep local roots. The latter two genres (totalling around 900 texts) make the Galician-Portuguese lyric unique in the entire panorama of medieval Romance poetry.

Troubadours with surviving melodies

 Aimeric de Belenoi
 Aimeric de Peguilhan
 Airas Nunes
 Albertet de Sestaro
 Arnaut Daniel
 Arnaut de Maruoill
 Beatritz de Dia
 Berenguier de Palazol
 Bernart de Ventadorn
 Bertran de Born
 Blacasset
 Cadenet

 Daude de Pradas
 Denis of Portugal
 Folquet de Marselha
 Gaucelm Faidit
 Gui d'Ussel
 Guilhem Ademar
 Guilhem Augier Novella
 Guilhem Magret
 Guilhem de Saint Leidier
 Guiraut de Bornelh
 Guiraut d'Espanha

 Guiraut Riquier
 Jaufre Rudel
 João Soares de Paiva
 João Zorro
 Jordan Bonel
 Marcabru
 Martín Codax
 Monge de Montaudon
 Peire d'Alvernhe
 Peire Cardenal
 Peire Raimon de Tolosa
 Peire Vidal
 Peirol
 Perdigon

 Pistoleta
 Pons d'Ortaffa
 Pons de Capduoill
 Raimbaut d'Aurenga
 Raimbaut de Vaqueiras
 Raimon Jordan
 Raimon de Miraval
 Rigaut de Berbezilh
 Uc Brunet
 Uc de Saint Circ
 William IX of Aquitaine

Composers of the high and late medieval era

Late medieval music (1300–1400)

France: Ars nova

The beginning of the Ars nova is one of the few clear chronological divisions in medieval music, since it corresponds to the publication of the Roman de Fauvel, a huge compilation of poetry and music, in 1310 and 1314. The Roman de Fauvel is a satire on abuses in the medieval church, and is filled with medieval motets, lais, rondeaux and other new secular forms. While most of the music is anonymous, it contains several pieces by Philippe de Vitry, one of the first composers of the isorhythmic motet, a development which distinguishes the fourteenth century. The isorhythmic motet was perfected by Guillaume de Machaut, the finest composer of the time.

During the Ars nova era, secular music acquired a polyphonic sophistication formerly found only in sacred music, a development not surprising considering the secular character of the early Renaissance (while this music is typically considered "medieval", the social forces that produced it were responsible for the beginning of the literary and artistic Renaissance in Italy—the distinction between Middle Ages and Renaissance is a blurry one, especially considering arts as different as music and painting). The term "Ars nova" (new art, or new technique) was coined by Philippe de Vitry in his treatise of that name (probably written in 1322), in order to distinguish the practice from the music of the immediately preceding age.

The dominant secular genre of the Ars Nova was the chanson, as it would continue to be in France for another two centuries. These chansons were composed in musical forms corresponding to the poetry they set, which were in the so-called formes fixes of rondeau, ballade, and virelai. These forms significantly affected the development of musical structure in ways that are felt even today; for example, the ouvert-clos rhyme-scheme shared by all three demanded a musical realization which contributed directly to the modern notion of antecedent and consequent phrases. It was in this period, too, in which began the long tradition of setting the mass ordinary. This tradition started around mid-century with isolated or paired settings of Kyries, Glorias, etc., but Machaut composed what is thought to be the first complete mass conceived as one composition. The sound world of Ars Nova music is very much one of linear primacy and rhythmic complexity. "Resting" intervals are the fifth and octave, with thirds and sixths considered dissonances. Leaps of more than a sixth in individual voices are not uncommon, leading to speculation of instrumental participation at least in secular performance. Surviving French manuscripts include the Ivrea Codex and the Apt Codex.

For information about specific French composers writing in late medieval era, see Jehan de Lescurel, Philippe de Vitry, Guillaume de Machaut, Borlet, Solage, and François Andrieu.

Italy: Trecento

Most of the music of Ars nova was French in origin; however, the term is often loosely applied to all of the music of the fourteenth century, especially to include the secular music in Italy. There this period was often referred to as Trecento. Italian music has always been known for its lyrical or melodic character, and this goes back to the 14th century in many respects. Italian secular music of this time (what little surviving liturgical music there is, is similar to the French except for somewhat different notation) featured what has been called the cantalina style, with a florid top voice supported by two (or even one; a fair amount of Italian Trecento music is for only two voices) that are more regular and slower moving. This type of texture remained a feature of Italian music in the popular 15th and 16th century secular genres as well, and was an important influence on the eventual development of the trio texture that revolutionized music in the 17th.

There were three main forms for secular works in the Trecento. One was the madrigal, not the same as that of 150–250 years later, but with a verse/refrain-like form. Three-line stanzas, each with different words, alternated with a two-line ritornello, with the same text at each appearance. Perhaps we can see the seeds of the subsequent late-Renaissance and Baroque ritornello in this device; it too returns again and again, recognizable each time, in contrast with its surrounding disparate sections. Another form, the caccia ("chase,") was written for two voices in a canon at the unison. Sometimes, this form also featured a ritornello, which was occasionally also in a canonic style. Usually, the name of this genre provided a double meaning, since the texts of caccia were primarily about hunts and related outdoor activities, or at least action-filled scenes; second meaning was that a voice caccia (follows, run after) the preceding one. The third main form was the ballata, which was roughly equivalent to the French virelai.

Surviving Italian manuscripts include the Squarcialupi Codex and the Rossi Codex. For information about specific Italian composers writing in the late medieval era, see Francesco Landini, Gherardello da Firenze, Andrea da Firenze, Lorenzo da Firenze, Giovanni da Firenze (aka Giovanni da Cascia), Bartolino da Padova, Jacopo da Bologna, Donato da Cascia, Lorenzo Masini, Niccolò da Perugia, and Maestro Piero.

Germany: Geisslerlieder

The Geisslerlieder were the songs of wandering bands of flagellants, who sought to appease the wrath of an angry God by penitential music accompanied by mortification of their bodies. There were two separate periods of activity of Geisslerlied: one around the middle of the thirteenth century, from which, unfortunately, no music survives (although numerous lyrics do); and another from 1349, for which both words and music survive intact due to the attention of a single priest who wrote about the movement and recorded its music. This second period corresponds to the spread of the Black Death in Europe, and documents one of the most terrible events in European history. Both periods of Geisslerlied activity were mainly in Germany.

Ars subtilior

As often seen at the end of any musical era, the end of the medieval era is marked by a highly manneristic style known as Ars subtilior. In some ways, this was an attempt to meld the French and Italian styles. This music was highly stylized, with a rhythmic complexity that was not matched until the 20th century. In fact, not only was the rhythmic complexity of this repertoire largely unmatched for five and a half centuries, with extreme syncopations, mensural trickery, and even examples of augenmusik (such as a chanson by Baude Cordier written out in manuscript in the shape of a heart), but also its melodic material was quite complex as well, particularly in its interaction with the rhythmic structures. Already discussed under Ars Nova has been the practice of isorhythm, which continued to develop through late-century and in fact did not achieve its highest degree of sophistication until early in the 15th century. Instead of using isorhythmic techniques in one or two voices, or trading them among voices, some works came to feature a pervading isorhythmic texture which rivals the integral serialism of the 20th century in its systematic ordering of rhythmic and tonal elements. The term "mannerism" was applied by later scholars, as it often is, in response to an impression of sophistication being practised for its own sake, a malady which some authors have felt infected the Ars subtilior.

One of the most important extant sources of Ars Subtilior chansons is the Chantilly Codex. For information about specific composers writing music in Ars subtilior style, see Anthonello de Caserta, Philippus de Caserta (aka Philipoctus de Caserta), Johannes Ciconia, Matteo da Perugia, Lorenzo da Firenze, Grimace, Jacob Senleches, and Baude Cordier.

Transitioning to the Renaissance

Demarcating the end of the medieval era and the beginning of the Renaissance era, with regard to the composition of music, is difficult. While the music of the fourteenth century is fairly obviously medieval in conception, the music of the early fifteenth century is often conceived as belonging to a transitional period, not only retaining some of the ideals of the end of the Middle Ages (such as a type of polyphonic writing in which the parts differ widely from each other in character, as each has its specific textural function), but also showing some of the characteristic traits of the Renaissance (such as the increasingly international style developing through the diffusion of Franco-Flemish musicians throughout Europe, and in terms of texture an increasing equality of parts). Music historians do not agree on when the Renaissance era began, but most historians agree that England was still a medieval society in the early fifteenth century (see periodization issues of the Middle Ages). While there is no consensus, 1400 is a useful marker, because it was around that time that the Renaissance came into full swing in Italy.

The increasing reliance on the interval of the third as a consonance is one of the most pronounced features of transition into the Renaissance. Polyphony, in use since the 12th century, became increasingly elaborate with highly independent voices throughout the 14th century. With John Dunstaple and other English composers, partly through the local technique of faburden (an improvisatory process in which a chant melody and a written part predominantly in parallel sixths above it are ornamented by one sung in perfect fourths below the latter, and which later took hold on the continent as "fauxbordon"), the interval of the third emerges as an important musical development; because of this Contenance Angloise ("English countenance"), English composers' music is often regarded as the first to sound less truly bizarre to 2000s-era audiences who are not trained in music history.

English stylistic tendencies in this regard had come to fruition and began to influence continental composers as early as the 1420s, as can be seen in works of the young Dufay, among others. While the Hundred Years' War continued, English nobles, armies, their chapels and retinues, and therefore some of their composers, travelled in France and performed their music there; it must also of course be remembered that the English controlled portions of northern France at this time. English manuscripts include the Worcester Fragments, the Old St. Andrews Music Book, the Old Hall Manuscript, and Egerton Manuscript. For information about specific composers who are considered transitional between the medieval and the Renaissance, see Zacara da Teramo, Paolo da Firenze, Giovanni Mazzuoli, Antonio da Cividale, Antonius Romanus, Bartolomeo da Bologna, Roy Henry, Arnold de Lantins, Leonel Power, and John Dunstaple.

An early composer from the Franco-Flemish School of the Renaissance was Johannes Ockeghem (1410/1425 –1497). He was the most famous member of the Franco-Flemish School in the last half of the 15th century, and is often considered the most influential composer between Dufay and Josquin des Prez. Ockeghem probably studied with Gilles Binchois, and at least was closely associated with him at the Burgundian court. Antoine Busnois wrote a motet in honor of Ockeghem. Ockeghem is a direct link from the Burgundian style to the next generation of Netherlanders, such as Obrecht and Josquin. A strong influence on Josquin des Prez and the subsequent generation of Netherlanders, Ockeghem was famous throughout Europe Charles VII for his expressive music, although he was equally renowned for his technical prowess.

Influence
The musical styles of Pérotin influenced 20th-century composers such as John Luther Adams and minimalist composer Steve Reich.

Bardcore, which involves remixing famous pop songs to have a medieval instrumentation, became a popular meme in 2020.

References

Sources

Further reading
 
 Butterfield, Ardis (2002), Poetry and Music in Medieval France, Cambridge: Cambridge University Press.
 Cyrus, Cynthia J. (1999), "Music": Medieval Glossary ORB Online Encyclopedia (15 October) (Archive from 9 August 2011; accessed 4 May 2017.
 Derrick, Henry (1983), The Listeners Guide to Medieval & Renaissance Music, New York, NY: Facts on File.
 
 
 Haines, John. (2004). “Erasures in Thirteenth-Century Music”. Music and Medieval Manuscripts: Paleography and Performance. Andershot: Ashgate. pg. 60–88.
 Haines, John. (2011). The Calligraphy of Medieval Music. Brepols Publishers. 
 Hartt, Jared C., ed. (2018), A Critical Companion to Medieval Motets, Woodbridge: Boydell.
 Pirrotta, Nino (1980), "Medieval" in The New Grove Dictionary of Music and Musicians, ed. Stanley Sadie, vol. 20, London: Macmillan.
 
 Remnant, M. 1965. 'The gittern in English medieval art', Galpin Society Journal, vol. 18, 104–9.
 Remnant, M. "The Use of Frets on Rebecs and Medieval Fiddles" Galpin Society Journal, 21, 1968, p. 146.
 Remnant, M. and Marks, R. 1980. 'A medieval "gittern"’, British Museum Yearbook 4, Music and Civilisation, 83–134.
 Remnant, M. "Musical Instruments of the West". 240 pp. Batsford, London, 1978. Reprinted by Batsford in 1989 . Digitized by the University of Michigan 17 May 2010.

External links

 Medieval Music & Arts Foundation
 DIAMM, the Digital Image Archive of Medieval Music
 
 The Schøyen Collection: Music (scans of medieval musical notation)
 Répertoire International des Sources Musicales (RISM), a free, searchable database of worldwide locations for music manuscripts up to ca. 1800